Jason T. James (born October 10, 1977) is an American high school basketball coach who is currently boys' varsity coach at Germantown High School in Germantown, Tennessee. He was previously a college basketball coach, most recently men's basketball head coach at the University of Tennessee at Martin (UT Martin).

Early life and education
Born in St. Louis, Missouri, James graduated from Parkway West High School in nearby Ballwin in 1996 and played basketball at Graceland College from 1996 to 2000. A guard, James was team captain as a senior.

Coaching career
From 2000 to 2002, James was an assistant coach at St. Louis Community College–Forest Park.

James spent seven seasons as a UT Martin assistant under coach Bret Campbell. James took over for Campbell in 2009, but proceeded to post a 37-117 overall record in five seasons. In 2013-14, the Skyhawks went 8-23 and did not qualify for the conference tournament. James was fired on March 3, 2014.

After leaving UT Martin, James became head boys' varsity basketball coach at Blytheville High School in Blytheville, Arkansas before taking the same job at Germantown High School in Germantown, Tennessee in 2015.

Head coaching record

References

1977 births
Living people
American men's basketball coaches
American men's basketball players
Basketball coaches from Missouri
Basketball players from St. Louis
College men's basketball head coaches in the United States
Graceland Yellowjackets men's basketball players
Junior college men's basketball coaches in the United States
UT Martin Skyhawks men's basketball coaches
High school basketball coaches in the United States
People from Ballwin, Missouri
Guards (basketball)